Venkatesh Maha is an Indian film director, screenwriter and actor who works in Telugu cinema. He's known for directing films such as C/o Kancharapalem (2018) and Uma Maheswara Ugra Roopasya (2020).

Career 
Maha left his house at the age of sixteen and worked at various jobs. He worked as a spot boy for the film Teen Maar (2011) before he made his acting debut with Aakasame Haddu that same year. He made his directorial debut with the film C/o Kancharapalem (2018) which was shot in the suburb of the same name. The cast of the film comprised entirely newcomers. Regarding his work in the film one critic noted that "Full marks to Venkatesh for not only coming up with a different kind of film but successfully carrying off the experiment of roping in locals for a film which is about themselves" whilst another stated that "If the director Venkatesh Maha is the brain behind this idea, he deserves credit yes". 

His next film was Uma Maheswara Ugra Roopasya (2020), the remake of the Malayalam film Maheshinte Prathikaaram. The film featured Satyadev Kancharana in the lead role and was shot extensively in the Araku valley. Regarding his casting in the film, a critic wrote that "And a big shout to Venkatesh Maha’s casting choices, which makes the movie more relatable".. In August 2021, Maha started Write Right Club for creative writers along with Puja Kolluru and other team members.

Filmography 
All films are in Telugu unless otherwise noted.

Awards and nominations

References 

Kannada KGF Chapter 2 & Yash’s ‘Rocky Bhai’ character abused by Telugu director, here’re the details

https://www.freepressjournal.in/regional-film-news/director-venkatesh-maha-abuses-yashs-kgf-character-rocky-angry-fans-demand-apology

https://odishatv.in/news/entertainment/kgf-chapter-2-yash-s-rocky-bhai-character-abused-by-telugu-director-here-re-the-details-198651

External links 

Indian film directors
Living people
Telugu film directors
Year of birth missing (living people)
People from Vijayawada
Film directors from Andhra Pradesh
People from Krishna district
21st-century Indian film directors
Tamil screenwriters
Indian screenwriters
Telugu screenwriters
Telugu male actors
Indian male film actors
Male actors in Telugu cinema